HPCVL is the High Performance Computing Virtual Laboratory, a consortium of 5 universities and 3 colleges providing high performance computing to researchers at these institutions and across Canada. They include Queen's University, Royal Military College of Canada, University of Ottawa, Carleton University, Toronto Metropolitan University, Loyalist College, St. Lawrence College, and Seneca College.

HPCVL is a member of Compute Canada, a national platform for dynamic resources, and includes the following consortia:

 CLUMEQ
 SHARCNET
 WestGrid
 SCinet
 ACEnet

References

Article about HPCVL

External links
 

Scientific organizations based in Canada